Delaware Basin could refer to:
 the New Mexico region called the Delaware Basin
 the Philadelphia metropolitan area called the Delaware Valley
 the Delaware River valley